Bahar Mert Üçoklar (born 13 December 1975 in Kardzhali, Bulgaria) is a retired Turkish volleyball player. She is 180 cm and plays as setter.

She plays for Türk Telekom Ankara. She has been on the team since 2007 and wears the number 1. She is the team's captain. 
She was a member of the Women's National Team that won the silver medal at the 2003 European Championship in Ankara.
She participated at the 2006 FIVB Women's World Championship.

Clubs
 1990-94  Eczacıbaşı Istanbul
 1994-00  Vakıfbank Ankara
 2000-01  Volley Cats Berlin
 2002-05  Eczacıbaşı Istanbul
 2006-07  Asystel Novara
 2007-09  Türk Telekom Ankara

Individual awards
 1998/1999 Women's CEV Champions League "Best Setter"

See also
 Turkish women in sports

References

 Official website of Italian Woman Volleyball League
 
 Türk Telekom Ankara Official Website Profile

External links
 Bahar Urcu at the International Volleyball Federation
 

1975 births
Living people
Turkish women's volleyball players
Türk Telekom volleyballers
Turkish expatriate volleyball players
Turkish expatriate sportspeople in Germany
Turkish expatriate sportspeople in Italy
Mediterranean Games gold medalists for Turkey
Mediterranean Games medalists in volleyball
Competitors at the 2005 Mediterranean Games
21st-century Turkish women